Dricus du Plessis (born 14 January 1994) is a  South African professional mixed martial artist currently competing in the Middleweight division of the Ultimate Fighting Championship (UFC). He previously competed in the Middleweight division of Extreme Fighting Championship (EFC), where he is the former Middleweight and Welterweight Champion. A professional since 2013, he has also competed for Polish-based promotion Konfrontacja Sztuk Walki (KSW). In addition to being a two-time EFC Middleweight and former EFC Welterweight Champion, he is also a former KSW Welterweight Champion.  As of March 7, 2023, he is #6 in the UFC middleweight rankings.

Background
Du Plessis started training judo at the age of five and eventually drifted to kickboxing at 14. Eventually he became a WAKO World Champion in K-1 style kickboxing, but migrated to mixed martial arts after realizing there was no money to be made in kickboxing. He attended University of Pretoria where he studied agricultural economics but dropped out during the final year to fully pursue a career in mixed martial arts.

Mixed martial arts career

Early career
Du Plessis made his professional debut in 2013, amassing an undefeated 4–0 record before facing future UFC veteran and then-EFC Middleweight Champion Garreth McLellan at EFC Africa 33, losing via guillotine choke submission in the third round.

In June 2015, Du Plessis made his Welterweight debut at EFC Africa 40 against Dino Bagattin, winning via a second-round rear-naked choke submission. After going 3–0 in 2015, Du Plessis faced veteran striker Martin Van Staden at EFC 50 for the vacant EFC Welterweight Championship. Du Plessis won via guillotine choke submission in the third round. Du Plessis was later set to defend his title against one of its former holders, Henry Fadipe. However, the bout was scrapped when Fadipe encountered issues with his visa.

Du Plessis returned to EFC in 2017, defeating Brazilian Mauricio Da Rocha Jr. in a Welterweight contest before facing Yannick Bahati at EFC Africa 62 for the Middleweight Championship. Du Plessis won by guillotine choke at 1:30 of the first round, becoming a two-weight class Champion within the promotion.

KSW
In 2018, Du Plessis was slated to face KSW Welterweight Champion Roberto Soldić for the KSW Welterweight Championship at KSW 43: Soldić vs. Du Plessis on April 14. In an upset, Du Plessis dethroned Soldic via TKO, after dropping him with a left hook. The two would later rematch at KSW 45: De Fries vs. Bedorf in the fall of that year, with Du Plessis being defeated via third-round knockout.

Du Plessis fought again for KSW at KSW 50 against Brazilian-German fighter Joilton Santos, winning via TKO.

Return to EFC
After Brendan Lesar upset veteran Garreth McLellan for the EFC Interim Middleweight Championship at EFC Africa 80, Du Plessis was next set to face Lesar for the title at EFC Africa 83. Du Plessis won via first-round guillotine choke submission.

Ultimate Fighting Championship
Du Plessis made his promotional debut against Markus Perez on 11 October 2020 at UFC Fight Night 179. He won the fight via knockout in round one.

Du Plessis was scheduled to face Trevin Giles on March 20, 2021 at UFC on ESPN 21. However, du Plessis pulled out due to visa issues which restricted his travel and was replaced by Roman Dolidze. The bout with Giles was rescheduled for July 10, 2021 on UFC 264. Du Plessis won the fight via knockout in round two. This win earned him the Performance of the Night award.

Du Plessis was scheduled to face Chris Curtis on April 9, 2022 at UFC 273. However, Curtis withdrew due to a wrist injury and was replaced by Anthony Hernandez. However, the bouts were yet again shuffled after Nassourdine Imavov withdrew due to visa issues, with Du Plessis now facing Kevin Gastelum. However, Gastelum withdrew a week before the event due to an undisclosed injury and his bout with du Plessis was cancelled.

Du Plessis then faced Brad Tavares at UFC 276 on July 2, 2022. He won the fight via unanimous decision.

Du Plessis faced Darren Till at UFC 282 on December 10, 2022. He won the fight via submission in round three. This fight earned him the Fight of the Night award.

Du Plessis faced Derek Brunson on March 4, 2023, at UFC 285. He won the fight via technical knockout due to a corner stoppage at 4:59 of the second round.

Championships and accomplishments 
Ultimate Fighting Championship
Performance of the Night (One time) 
Fight of the Night (One time) 
Extreme Fighting Championship 
EFC Middleweight Champion (one time; former)
One title defense
EFC Welterweight Champion (one time; former)
Konfrontacja Sztuk Walki
KSW Welterweight Champion (one time; former)
Fight of the Night (one time) 
Performance of the Night (one time)

Mixed martial arts record

|-
|Win
|align=center|19–2
|Derek Brunson
|TKO (corner stoppage)
|UFC 285
|
|align=center|2
|align=center|4:59
|Las Vegas, Nevada, United States
|
|- 
|Win
|align=center|18–2
|Darren Till
|Submission (face crank)
|UFC 282
|
|align=center|3
|align=center|2:43
|Las Vegas, Nevada, United States
|
|-
|Win
|align=center|17–2
|Brad Tavares
|Decision (unanimous)
|UFC 276
| 
|align=center|3
|align=center|5:00
|Las Vegas, Nevada, United States
|
|-
|Win
|align=center|16–2
|Trevin Giles
|KO (punches)
|UFC 264 
|
|align=center|2
|align=center|1:41
|Las Vegas, Nevada, United States
|
|-
|Win
|align=center|15–2
|Markus Perez
|KO (punches)
|UFC Fight Night: Moraes vs. Sandhagen
|
|align=center|1
|align=center|3:22
|Abu Dhabi, United Arab Emirates
|
|-
|Win
|align=center|14–2
|Brendan Lesar
|Submission (guillotine choke)
|EFC Africa 83
|
|align=center|1
|align=center|4:15
|Gauteng, South Africa
|
|-
|Win
|align=center|13–2
|Joilton Santos
|TKO (punches)
|KSW 50
|
|align=center|2
|align=center|3:04
|London, England
|
|-
|Loss
|align=center|12–2
|Roberto Soldić
|KO (punches)
|KSW 45
|
|align=center|3
|align=center|2:33
|London, England
|
|-
|Win
|align=center|12–1
|Roberto Soldić
|TKO (punches)
|KSW 43
|
|align=center|2
|align=center|1:37
|Wrocław, Poland
|
|-
|Win
|align=center|11–1
|Yannick Bahati
|Submission (guillotine choke)
|EFC Africa 62
|
|align=center|1
|align=center|1:30
|Gauteng, South Africa
|
|-
|Win
|align=center|10–1
|Maurício da Rocha Jr.
|TKO (punches)
|EFC Africa 59
|
|align=center|1
|align=center|3:58
|Gauteng, South Africa
|
|-
|Win
|align=center|9–1
|Rafał Haratyk
|Submission (guillotine choke)
|EFC Africa 56
|
|align=center|2
|align=center|3:34
|Gauteng, South Africa
|
|-
|Win
|align=center|8–1
|Martin van Staden
|Submission (guillotine choke)
|EFC Africa 50
|
|align=center|3
|align=center|3:59
|Gauteng, South Africa
|
|-
|Win
|align=center|7–1
|Bruno Mukulu
|Submission (rear-naked choke)
|EFC Africa 46
|
|align=center|2
|align=center|2:50
|Gauteng, South Africa
|
|-
|Win
|align=center|6–1
|Dino Bagattin 
|Submission (rear-naked choke)
|EFC Africa 40
|
|align=center|2
|align=center|3:33
|Gauteng, South Africa
|
|-
|Win
|align=center|5–1
|Darren Daniel
|Submission (rear-naked choke)
|EFC Africa 37
|
|align=center|1
|align=center|4:50
|Gauteng, South Africa
|
|-
|Loss
|align=center|4–1
|Garreth McLellan
|Submission (guillotine choke)
|EFC Africa 33
|
|align=center|3
|align=center|2:12
|Gauteng, South Africa
|
|-
|Win
|align=center|4–0
|Donavin Hawkey
|TKO (punches)
|EFC Africa 27
|
|align=center|1
|align=center|4:50
|Gauteng, South Africa
|
|-
|Win
|align=center|3–0
|JC Lambrecht
|Submission (rear-naked choke)
|EFC Africa 24
|
|align=center|3
|align=center|1:54
|Gauteng, South Africa
|
|-
|Win
|align=center|2–0
|Bruno Mukulu
|Submission (rear-naked choke)
|EFC Africa 23
|
|align=center|1
|align=center|2:34
|Gauteng, South Africa
|
|-
|Win
|align=center|1–0
|Tshikangu Makuebo
|TKO (knee injury)
|EFC Africa 21
|
|align=center|1
|align=center|1:18
|Gauteng, South Africa
|
|-

See also
 List of current UFC fighters
 List of male mixed martial artists

References

External links
 

1994 births
Living people
South African male mixed martial artists
Sportspeople from Pretoria
Middleweight mixed martial artists
Welterweight mixed martial artists
Mixed martial artists utilizing kickboxing
South African male kickboxers